Noel Wallace Zunneberg (born 13 August 1946) is a former Australian rules footballer who played with Fitzroy. Often considered as one of the most underrated centre half backs, Zunneberg was a strong mark and a regular player for Fitzroy for five years. After 1972, he moved to Preston in the Victorian Football Association, and he served as its captain in 1975.

References

 Holmesby, Russell & Main, Jim (2007). The Encyclopedia of AFL Footballers. 7th ed. Melbourne: Bas Publishing.

External links
 
 
 Noel Zunneberg's playing statistics from the VFA Project

Living people
Australian rules footballers from Victoria (Australia)
Fitzroy Football Club players
Preston Football Club (VFA) players
1946 births